Harish Bhimani (born 15 February) is a voiceover artiste and anchor.He is the voice of Samay, the narrator of the TV series  Mahabharat

Personal life
Harish was born in Mumbai. His brother Kishore Bhimani was a famous sports journalist and cricket commentator.

Career
He started with TV news anchoring on Bombay TV; from narrating the Mahabharat to the legendary playback singer Lata Mangeshkar’s biography titled, In Search of Lata Mangeshkar, Ajeeb Dastan Hai Yeh (1995);
He is set to be the voice of the god Shiva in the MOBA Smite.
Harish was conferred with the coveted (63rd) National Award for Voiceovers/Narration 2015

Works
Lata Didi Ajeeb Dastan Hai Yeh (Hindi). 1995, .

References

External links
 
 Harish Bhimani at last.fm

Living people
Indian male voice actors
Writers from Mumbai
1956 births
Indian television news anchors
Masters of ceremonies